Pumiao is a town in the Yongning District, in the eastern suburbs of Nanning, Guangxi Zhuang Autonomous Region, People's Republic of China, on the southern (right) bank of the Yong River.

References

Towns of Guangxi
Nanning